Briggs Bridge is a railway bridge in Central Alberta. It is one of the few remaining timber bridges in Alberta. It is currently in use.

See also 
 List of bridges in Canada

References

Railway bridges in Alberta